Adiljan Tulendibaev (born 11 April 1985) is an Uzbekistani judoka.

He finished in joint fifth place in the open weight class division at the 2006 Asian Games, having lost to Askhat Zhitkeyev of Kazakhstan in the bronze medal match.

He currently resides in the Tashkent region.

References

External links
 
 
 2006 Asian Games profile

1985 births
Living people
Uzbekistani male judoka
Judoka at the 2006 Asian Games
Asian Games competitors for Uzbekistan
Judoka at the 2016 Summer Paralympics
Paralympic gold medalists for Uzbekistan
Paralympic medalists in judo
Medalists at the 2016 Summer Paralympics
Paralympic judoka of Uzbekistan
20th-century Uzbekistani people
21st-century Uzbekistani people